98th Division may refer to:

 98th Division (2nd Formation) (People's Republic of China)
 98th Infantry Division (Germany), a unit of the German Army 
 98th Paratroopers Division (IDF), a unit of the Israeli Army
 98th Cavalry Division (Soviet Union), a unit of the Red Army
 98th Rifle Division, a unit of the Red Army
 98th Guards Airborne Division, a unit of the Russian Army, the former 98th Guards Rifle Division of the Soviet Red Army 
 98th Division (United States), a unit of the United States Army

See also
 98th Regiment (disambiguation)
 98 Squadron (disambiguation)